The Bath County Pumped Storage Station is a pumped storage hydroelectric power plant, which is described as the "largest battery in the world", with a maximum generation capacity of 3,003 MW, an average of 2,772 MW, and a total storage capacity of 24,000 MWh. The station is located in the northern corner of Bath County, Virginia, on the southeast side of the Eastern Continental Divide, which forms this section of the border between Virginia and West Virginia. It was the largest pumped-storage power station in the world until 2021, when it was surpassed by the Fengning Pumped Storage Power Station.

Bath County Station is jointly owned by Dominion Generation (60%) and FirstEnergy (40%), and managed by Dominion. It stores energy for PJM Interconnection, a regional transmission organization in 13 states and the District of Columbia.

Design
The upper and lower reservoirs are created by earth and rock-filled embankment dams. The conduits each lead to a  shaft which bifurcates into two penstocks (for a total of six) before reaching the turbines.

Method of operation 
Water is released from the upper reservoir during periods of high demand and is used to generate electricity. What makes this different from other hydroelectric dams is that during times of low demand, power is taken from coal, nuclear, and other power plants and is used to pump water from the lower to the upper reservoir. Although this plant uses more power than it generates, it allows these other plants to operate at close to peak efficiency for an overall cost savings. Back Creek and Little Back Creek, the water sources used to create the reservoirs, have a relatively small flow rate. However, since water is pumped between the reservoirs equally, the only water taken from these creeks now that the reservoirs are full is to replace the water lost to evaporation.

Environment
A fishing habitat was created downstream of the facility.
In times of drought water quality can be maintained by using nearby recreational reservoirs to supply extra water to the creeks. The creeks and recreational reservoirs have water quality sufficient for fish.

See also 

 List of energy storage projects
 Pumped-storage hydroelectricity
 List of largest hydroelectric power stations in the United States

References

External links 
 Dominion Resources
FirstEnergy
 Bath County Pumped Storage Station Home Page

Energy infrastructure completed in 1985
Buildings and structures in Bath County, Virginia
Hydroelectric power plants in Virginia
Pumped-storage hydroelectric power stations in the United States
Dams in Virginia
1985 establishments in Virginia
Earth-filled dams
Rock-filled dams
Dams completed in 1985